Jokes and Their Relation to the Unconscious is a 1905 book on the psychoanalysis of jokes and humour by Sigmund Freud, the founder of psychoanalysis. In the work, Freud describes the psychological processes and techniques of jokes, which he compares to the processes and techniques of dreamwork and the unconscious.

Contents
Freud claims that "our enjoyment of the joke" indicates what is being repressed in more serious talk. Freud argues that the success of the joke depends upon a psychic economy, whereby the joke allows one to overcome inhibitions.

According to Freud, understanding of joke technique is essential for understanding jokes and their relation to the unconscious, however, these techniques are what make a joke a joke. Freud also noted that the listener laughing really heartily at the joke will typically not be in the mood for investigating its technique.

Structure
The book is divided into three sections: "analytic," "synthetic" and "theoretical."

Analytic part
The book's first section includes a discussion on the techniques and tendencies of jokes.

Synthetic part
The second section includes a discussion on the psychological origins and motives of the joke and the joke as a social process.

Theoretical part
The book's final section discusses the joke's relation to dreams and the Unconscious.

See also
Humour in Freud
Sigmund Freud bibliography

References

1905 non-fiction books
Books by Sigmund Freud